TEAP FC is a Nigerian football club. They play in the second-tier division in Nigerian football, the Nigeria National League. They are one of the main clubs in Abuja. Old Parade Ground is their home, which has capacity for 5,000 people.

Current squad

References

Football clubs in Nigeria
Sports clubs in Nigeria
2010 establishments in Nigeria
Association football clubs established in 2010